Play date or playdate is an expression, primarily used in the United States, for an arranged appointment for children to meet and play. It should not be confused with dating as there is no implied romantic component.

Play dates have become common because the work schedules for busy parents, along with media warnings about leaving children unattended, prevent the kind of play that children of other generations participated in.

Play dates are also arranged by destinations that feature child-friendly programs like museums, parks, or playgrounds.

The intention of a play date is to give children time to interact freely in a less structured environment than other planned activities might provide. Play dates are different from organized activities or scheduled sports, because they usually lack structure, rules, and plans.

References

External links 
 

Parenting
Play (activity)